Charles Sprague may refer to:

 Charles Sprague (poet) (1791–1875), American poet
 Charles James Sprague (1823–1903), American botanist
 Charles Sprague Smith (1853–1910), activist and founder of the People's Institute during the Progressive era
 Charles A. Sprague (1887–1969), Governor of Oregon, 1939–1943
 Charles Ezra Sprague (1842–1912), American accountant
 Charles F. Sprague (1857–1902), U.S. Representative from Massachusetts
 Charlie Sprague (1864–1912), American baseball player